The , sometimes called Souzou Gakuen University was a private university in Takasaki, Gunma, Japan, established in 2004. The president of the school was Daitetsu Koike.

On 28 March 2013, the university was ordered to close by the Ministry of Education, Culture, Sports, Science and Technology for violating the Private Schools Act.

Campuses
The university had two campuses:

Nakayama campus
Housed the Creative Arts Department.

Location: 2229 Iwasaki, Yoshii-machi, Tano-gun, Gunma-ken

Yachiyo campus
Housed the Social Work Department.

Location: 2-3-6 Yachiyo-machi, Takasaki-shi, Gunma-ken

References

External links

 Official website 
 Official English website 
 Official ELD e-learning department site 

Educational institutions established in 2004
Educational institutions disestablished in 2013
Souzou Gakuen University
2004 establishments in Japan
Defunct private universities and colleges in Japan